Paul William Batty (born 9 January 1964) is a former professional footballer who made nearly 250 appearances in the Football League. He played as a midfielder.

Batty began his career as an apprentice with Swindon Town, turning professional in January 1982. He made his debut on 25 September 1982 as Swindon won 1-0 at home to Crewe Alexandra and remained a regular for the next two seasons. He lost his place late in 1985 and was released at the end of the season.

He joined Chesterfield but left to join Exeter City in 1986. After five years with Exeter he dropped out of league football, joining Yeovil Town in March 1991. In 1992, he scored a hat-trick as Yeovil knocked Football League team Torquay United out of the FA Cup. He joined Bath City in July 1993, scoring the goal that knocked league side Hereford United out of the following season's FA Cup. He struggled with a knee injury towards the end of the season and left to join Salisbury City in July 1994.

References

1964 births
Living people
People from Edlington
Association football midfielders
English footballers
Swindon Town F.C. players
Chesterfield F.C. players
Exeter City F.C. players
Yeovil Town F.C. players
Bath City F.C. players
Salisbury City F.C. players
English Football League players
National League (English football) players
Southern Football League players